This is a chronological list of United States federal legislation passed by the 107th and subsequent United States Congresses, starting in 2001. It includes links to articles on major legislation. For comprehensive lists, see the lists of acts passed by each Congress. For the main article on this subject, see List of United States federal legislation. Additional lists can be found at List of United States federal legislation: Congress of the Confederation, List of United States federal legislation, 1789–1901 and List of United States federal legislation, 1901–2001.

107th United States Congress 

 June 7, 2001: Economic Growth and Tax Relief Reconciliation Act of 2001, 
 September 18, 2001: Authorization for Use of Military Force of 2001, 
 October 26, 2001: Patriot Act, 
 November 19, 2001: Aviation and Transportation Security Act, 
 December 21, 2001: Zimbabwe Democracy and Economic Recovery Act of 2001, 
 January 8, 2002: No Child Left Behind Act, 
 January 11, 2002: Small Business Liability Relief and Brownfields Revitalization Act, 
 March 9, 2002: Job Creation and Worker Assistance Act of 2002, 
 March 27, 2002: Bipartisan Campaign Reform Act (McCain-Feingold), 
 May 13, 2002: Farm Security and Rural Investment Act of 2002, 
 July 30, 2002: Sarbanes–Oxley Act, 
 August 6, 2002: Trade Act of 2002, 
 October 16, 2002: Authorization for Use of Military Force Against Iraq Resolution of 2002, 
 October 21, 2002: Sudan Peace Act, 
 October 29, 2002: Help America Vote Act, 
 November 25, 2002: Homeland Security Act of 2002, 
 December 17, 2002: E-Government Act of 2002,

108th United States Congress 

 March 11, 2003: Do-Not-Call Implementation Act of 2003, 
 April 30, 2003: PROTECT (Prosecutorial Remedies and Other Tools to end the Exploitation of Children Today) Act,  (including Illicit Drug Anti-Proliferation Act)
 May 28, 2003: Jobs and Growth Tax Relief Reconciliation Act of 2003, 
 September 4, 2003: Prison Rape Elimination Act of 2003, 
 October 28, 2003: Check 21 Act, 
 November 5, 2003: Partial-Birth Abortion Ban Act, 
 December 4, 2003: Fair and Accurate Credit Transactions Act, 
 December 8, 2003: Medicare Prescription Drug, Improvement, and Modernization Act, 
 December 12, 2003: Syria Accountability and Lebanese Sovereignty Restoration Act, 
 December 16, 2003: CAN-SPAM Act, 
 March 25, 2004: Unborn Victims of Violence Act (Laci and Conner's Law), 
 June 30, 2004: Bunning-Bereuter-Blumenauer Flood Insurance Reform Act, 
 July 7, 2004: GAO Human Capital Reform Act of 2004, 
 October 16, 2004: Global Anti-Semitism Review Act, 
 October 18, 2004: North Korean Human Rights Act of 2004, 
 October 20, 2004: Belarus Democracy Act of 2004, 
 December 17, 2004: Intelligence Reform and Terrorism Prevention Act,

109th United States Congress 

 February 17, 2005: Class Action Fairness Act of 2005, 
 March 21, 2005: Theresa Marie Schiavo's law, 
 April 20, 2005: Bankruptcy Abuse Prevention and Consumer Protection Act, 
 April 27, 2005: Family Entertainment and Copyright Act, 
 July 28, 2005: Dominican Republic-Central America-United States Free Trade Agreement Implementation Act (CAFTA Implementation Act), 
 July 29, 2005: Energy Policy Act of 2005, 
 August 10, 2005: Transportation Equity Act of 2005, 
 October 26, 2005: Protection of Lawful Commerce in Arms Act, 
 December 1, 2005: Caribbean National Forest Act of 2005, 
 December 22, 2005: Presidential $1 Coin Act of 2005, 
 December 30, 2005: Department of Defense Appropriations Act, 2006,  (including McCain Detainee Amendment)
 February 8, 2006: Deficit Reduction Act of 2005,  (including Federal Deposit Insurance Reform Act)
 May 17, 2006: Tax Increase Prevention and Reconciliation Act of 2005, 
 May 29, 2006: Respect for America's Fallen Heroes Act, 
 July 27, 2006: Adam Walsh Child Protection and Safety Act, 
 September 26, 2006: Federal Funding Accountability and Transparency Act of 2006, 
 September 30, 2006: Iran Freedom and Support Act, 
 October 13, 2006: Darfur Peace and Accountability Act, 
 October 13, 2006: Safe Port Act,  (including Unlawful Internet Gambling Enforcement Act of 2006)
 October 17, 2006: Military Commissions Act of 2006, 
 October 26, 2006: Secure Fence Act of 2006, 
 December 19, 2006: Combating Autism Act, 
 December 20, 2006: Tax Relief and Health Act of 2006, 
 December 20, 2006: Stolen Valor Act of 2005,

110th United States Congress 

 February 2, 2007: House Page Board Revision Act of 2007, 
 May 25, 2007: U.S. Troop Readiness, Veterans' Care, Katrina Recovery, and Iraq Accountability Appropriations Act, 2007, 
 June 14, 2007: Preserving United States Attorney Independence Act of 2007,  (including Fair Minimum Wage Act of 2007)
 July 26, 2007: Foreign Investment and National Security Act of 2007, 
 August 3, 2007: Implementing Recommendations of the 9/11 Commission Act of 2007, 
 August 5, 2007: Protect America Act of 2007, 
 September 14, 2007: Honest Leadership and Open Government Act, 
 September 27, 2007: Food and Drug Administration Amendments Act of 2007, 
 November 8, 2007: Water Resources Development Act of 2007, 
 December 19, 2007: Energy Independence and Security Act of 2007, 
 February 13, 2008: Economic Stimulus Act of 2008, 
 May 21, 2008: Genetic Information Nondiscrimination Act, 
 May 22, 2008: Food, Conservation, and Energy Act of 2008, 
 June 30, 2008: Supplemental Appropriations Act of 2008,  (including Post-9/11 Veterans Educational Assistance Act of 2008 / "G.I. Bill 2008")
 July 10, 2008: FISA Amendments Act of 2008, 
 July 29, 2008: Tom Lantos Block Burmese JADE (Junta's Anti-Democratic Efforts) Act of 2008, 
 July 30, 2008: Housing and Economic Recovery Act of 2008, 
 October 3, 2008: Emergency Economic Stabilization Act of 2008, 
 October 7, 2008: Emmett Till Unsolved Civil Rights Crime Act, 
 December 23, 2008: Child Soldiers Prevention Act, Title IV,

111th United States Congress 

 January 29, 2009: Lilly Ledbetter Fair Pay Act of 2009, 
 February 4, 2009: Children's Health Insurance Program Reauthorization Act (SCHIP), 
 February 17, 2009: American Recovery and Reinvestment Act of 2009 (ARRA), 
 March 11, 2009: Omnibus Appropriations Act of 2009, 
 March 30, 2009: Omnibus Public Land Management Act of 2009, 
 April 21, 2009: Edward M. Kennedy Serve America Act, 
 May 20, 2009: Fraud Enforcement and Recovery Act of 2009, 
 May 20, 2009: Helping Families Save Their Homes Act of 2009, 
 May 22, 2009: Weapon Systems Acquisition Reform Act of 2009, 
 May 22, 2009: Credit CARD Act of 2009, 
 June 24, 2009: Supplemental Appropriations Act of 2009 including the Car Allowance Rebate System (Cash for Clunkers), 
 October 28, 2009: National Defense Authorization Act for Fiscal Year 2010, including the Matthew Shepard and James Byrd, Jr. Hate Crimes Prevention Act, 
 November 6, 2009: Worker, Homeownership, and Business Assistance Act of 2009, 
 March 18, 2010: Hiring Incentives to Restore Employment Act, 
 March 23, 2010: Patient Protection and Affordable Care Act, 
 March 30, 2010: Health Care and Education Reconciliation Act of 2010, including the Student Aid and Fiscal Responsibility Act,  
 May 5, 2010: Caregivers and Veterans Omnibus Health Services Act of 2010, 
 July 1, 2010: Comprehensive Iran Sanctions, Accountability, and Divestment Act of 2010, 
 July 21, 2010: Dodd–Frank Wall Street Reform and Consumer Protection Act, 
 August 10, 2010: SPEECH Act, 
 September 27, 2010: Small Business Jobs Act of 2010, 
 December 8, 2010: Claims Resolution Act of 2010, 
 December 13, 2010: Healthy, Hunger-Free Kids Act of 2010, 
 December 17, 2010: Tax Relief, Unemployment Insurance Reauthorization, and Job Creation Act of 2010, 
 December 22, 2010: Don't Ask, Don't Tell Repeal Act of 2010, 
 January 2, 2011: James Zadroga 9/11 Health and Compensation Act of 2010, 
 January 7, 2011: Ike Skelton National Defense Authorization Act for Fiscal Year 2011,

112th United States Congress 

 April 15, 2011: Department of Defense and Full-Year Continuing Appropriations Act, 2011, 
 August 2, 2011: Budget Control Act of 2011, 
 September 16, 2011: Leahy–Smith America Invents Act, 
 October 21, 2011:  United States–Korea Free Trade Agreement Implementation Act, 
 October 21, 2011:  United States–Colombia Trade Promotion Agreement Implementation Act, 
 October 21, 2011:  United States–Panama Trade Promotion Agreement Implementation Act, 
 December 31, 2011: National Defense Authorization Act for Fiscal Year 2012, 
 February 22, 2012:  Middle Class Tax Relief and Job Creation Act of 2012, 
 March 8, 2012: Federal Restricted Buildings and Grounds Improvement Act of 2011, 
 April 4, 2012: Stop Trading on Congressional Knowledge Act of 2012 (STOCK Act), 
 April 5, 2012: Jumpstart Our Business Startups Act (JOBS Act), 
 July 6, 2012: Moving Ahead for Progress in the 21st Century Act (MAP-21 Act), 
 July 9, 2012: Food and Drug Administration Safety and Innovation Act (FDASIA), 
 September 28, 2012: Continuing Appropriations Resolution, 2013, 
 November 27, 2012: Whistleblower Protection Enhancement Act of 2012, 
 December 14, 2012: Magnitsky Act, 
 January 2, 2013: American Taxpayer Relief Act of 2012,

113th United States Congress 

 March 7, 2013: Violence Against Women Reauthorization Act of 2013, 
 March 13, 2013: Pandemic and All-Hazards Preparedness Reauthorization Act of 2013, 
 March 26, 2013: Consolidated and Further Continuing Appropriations Act, 2013, 
 June 3, 2013: Stolen Valor Act of 2013, 
 August 9, 2013: Hydropower Regulatory Efficiency Act of 2013, 
 August 9, 2013: Bipartisan Student Loan Certainty Act of 2013, 
 September 30, 2013: Pay Our Military Act, 
 November 27, 2013: Drug Quality and Security Act, 
 December 26, 2013: National Defense Authorization Act for Fiscal Year 2014, 
 January 17, 2014: Consolidated Appropriations Act, 2014, 
 February 7, 2014: Agricultural Act of 2014, 
 March 21, 2014: Homeowner Flood Insurance Affordability Act of 2014, 
 April 3, 2014: Gabriella Miller Kids First Research Act, 
 April 3, 2014: Support for the Sovereignty, Integrity, Democracy, and Economic Stability of Ukraine Act of 2014, 
 May 9, 2014: Digital Accountability and Transparency Act of 2014 (DATA), 
 May 20, 2014: Kilah Davenport Child Protection Act of 2013, 
 June 10, 2014: Water Resources Reform and Development Act of 2013, 
 July 23, 2014: Workforce Innovation and Opportunity Act, 
 August 1, 2014: Unlocking Consumer Choice and Wireless Competition Act, 
 August 7, 2014: Veterans' Access to Care through Choice, Accountability, and Transparency Act of 2014, 
 September 29, 2014: Preventing Sex Trafficking and Strengthening Families Act, 
 October 6, 2014: IMPACT Act of 2014, 
 November 26, 2014: Presidential and Federal Records Act Amendments of 2014, 
 November 26, 2014: Government Reports Elimination Act of 2014, 
 December 18, 2014: Death in Custody Reporting Act of 2013, 
 December 18, 2014: Transportation Security Acquisition Reform Act, 
 December 18, 2014: American Savings Promotion Act, 
 December 18, 2014: Credit Union Share Insurance Fund Parity Act, 
 December 18, 2014: EPS Service Parts Act of 2014 , 
 December 18, 2014: Ukraine Freedom Support Act of 2014, 
 December 18, 2014: Venezuela Defense of Human Rights and Civil Society Act of 2014, 
 December 18, 2014: Insurance Capital Standards Clarification Act of 2014,

114th United States Congress 

 January 12, 2015: Terrorism Risk Insurance Program Reauthorization Act of 2015, 
 April 16, 2015: Medicare Access and CHIP Reauthorization Act of 2015, 
 May 22, 2015: Iran Nuclear Agreement Review Act of 2015, 
 June 2, 2015: USA Freedom Act (Uniting and Strengthening America by Fulfilling Rights and Ensuring Effective Discipline Over Monitoring Act of 2015), 
 June 29, 2015: Trade Preferences Extension Act of 2015, 
 July 6, 2015: Department of Homeland Security Interoperable Communications Act, 
 November 2, 2015: Bipartisan Budget Act of 2015, 
 November 5, 2015: Librarian of Congress Succession Modernization Act of 2015,  
 November 25, 2015: SPACE Act of 2015, 
 December 4, 2015: Fixing America's Surface Transportation (FAST) Act, 
 December 10, 2015: Every Student Succeeds Act, 
 December 18, 2015: Consolidated Appropriations Act, 2016, 
 February 8, 2016: Coast Guard Authorization Act of 2015, 
 February 24, 2016: Internet Tax Freedom Act contained in Trade Facilitation and Trade Enforcement Act of 2015, 
 May 11, 2016: Defend Trade Secrets Act, 
 June 30, 2016: PROMESA (Puerto Rico Oversight, Management, and Economic Stability Act), 
 July 20, 2016: Global Food Security Act of 2016, 
 September 28, 2016: Justice Against Sponsors of Terrorism Act, 
 October 7, 2016: Sexual Assault Survivors’ Rights Act, 
 December 13, 2016: 21st Century Cures Act,

115th United States Congress 

 May 5, 2017: Consolidated Appropriations Act, 2017, 
 August 2, 2017: Countering America’s Adversaries Through Sanctions Act, 
 December 12, 2017: National Defense Authorization Act for Fiscal Year 2018, 
 December 22, 2017: Tax Cuts and Jobs Act of 2017, 
 February 9, 2018: Bipartisan Budget Act of 2018, 
 March 23, 2018: Consolidated Appropriations Act, 2018, 
 April 11, 2018: Stop Enabling Sex Traffickers Act, 
 May 24, 2018: Economic Growth, Regulatory Relief and Consumer Protection Act, 
 May 30, 2018: Trickett Wendler, Frank Mongiello, Jordan McLinn, and Matthew Bellina Right to Try Act of 2017, 
 August 13, 2018: John S. McCain National Defense Authorization Act for Fiscal Year 2019, 
 October 5, 2018: FAA Reauthorization Act of 2018, 
 October 11, 2018: Music Modernization Act, 
 December 20, 2018: Agriculture Improvement Act of 2018, 
 December 21, 2018: First Step Act,

116th United States Congress

 January 16, 2019: Government Employee Fair Treatment Act of 2019, 
 January 25, 2019: Further Additional Continuing Appropriations Act, 2019, 
 February 15, 2019: Consolidated Appropriations Act, 2019, 
 March 12, 2019: John D. Dingell, Jr. Conservation, Management, and Recreation Act, 
 June 24, 2019: Pandemic and All-Hazards Preparedness and Advancing Innovation Act, 
 July 1, 2019: Taxpayer First Act, 
 November 27, 2019: Hong Kong Human Rights and Democracy Act, 
 December 20, 2019: National Defense Authorization Act for Fiscal Year 2020, 
 January 29, 2020: United States–Mexico–Canada Agreement Implementation Act, 
 March 6, 2020: Coronavirus Preparedness and Response Supplemental Appropriations Act, 2020, 
 March 18, 2020: Families First Coronavirus Response Act, 
 March 26, 2020: Taiwan Allies International Protection and Enhancement Initiative Act (TAIPEI Act), 
 March 27, 2020: CARES Act (Coronavirus Aid, Relief, and Economic Security Act), 
 April 24, 2020: Paycheck Protection Program and Health Care Enhancement Act, 
 June 17, 2020: Uyghur Human Rights Policy Act, 
 July 14, 2020: Hong Kong Autonomy Act, 
 August 4, 2020: Great American Outdoors Act, 
 December 27, 2020: Consolidated Appropriations Act, 2021, 
 January 1, 2021: William M. (Mac) Thornberry National Defense Authorization Act for Fiscal Year 2021,

117th United States Congress 

 March 11, 2021: American Rescue Plan Act of 2021, 
 November 10, 2021: RENACER Act, 
 November 15, 2021: Infrastructure Investment and Jobs Act, 
 December 22, 2021: Capitol Police Emergency Assistance Act of 2021, 
 December 27, 2021: National Defense Authorization Act for Fiscal Year 2022, 
 March 15, 2022: Consolidated Appropriations Act, 2022, 
 March 29, 2022: Emmett Till Antilynching Act, 
 April 6, 2022: Postal Service Reform Act of 2022, 
 May 9, 2022: Ukraine Democracy Defense Lend-Lease Act of 2022, 
 June 25, 2022: Bipartisan Safer Communities Act, 

 2001